Paynesville is an unincorporated community in McDowell County, West Virginia, United States. Paynesville is located along West Virginia Route 83 at the Virginia border. Paynesville has a post office with ZIP code 24873.

On May 29, 1961, Paynesville residents Mr. and Mrs. Alderson Muncy were the first people in the United States to receive food stamps under the modern food stamp program. They received $95 for their 15-person household.

Climate
The climate in this area is characterized by hot, humid summers and generally mild to cool winters.  According to the Köppen Climate Classification system, Paynesville has a humid subtropical climate, abbreviated "Cfa" on climate maps.

References

Unincorporated communities in McDowell County, West Virginia
Unincorporated communities in West Virginia